The 1991–92 Montreal Canadiens season was the team's 83rd season. The season saw the Canadiens won the Adams Division and make it to the second round of the playoffs, losing to the Boston Bruins in the Adams Division final. After the sweep, head coach Pat Burns resigned.

Pre-season
The Canadiens changed their personnel in the off-season. Andrew Cassels, Tom Chorske, Stephane Richer and Ryan Walter were traded. The Canadiens picked up Kirk Muller and Roland Melanson.

Regular season
The team started well, losing just three times in October. At New Year's, the team led the league overall standings with 54 points. In February, the Canadiens reacquired Chris Nilan three years after he left Montreal. In the last 17 games of his NHL career, the veteran enforcer adds 74 penalty minutes to raise his overall total with the Canadiens to 2,248 minutes, the most in team history. In March, the team traded Petr Svoboda to Buffalo in return for Kevin Haller.

March was dismal for the team, winning only four of 11 games. On April 1, the league's players went on a ten-day strike. The regular season resumed and the Canadiens continued to struggle, slipping to fifth-place overall, but finished first in the Adams Division. The team played well defensively, winning the William M. Jennings Trophy, Patrick Roy winning the Vezina Trophy and Guy Carbonneau winning the Frank J. Selke Trophy and finished +60 in goals.

The Canadiens finished first in the NHL in goaltending, allowing only 207 goals. Furthermore, they tied the Winnipeg Jets for most shutouts, with 7, and they tied the New York Rangers and Washington Capitals for fewest power-play goals allowed, with just 60. The Canadiens were the most disciplined team during the regular season, being short-handed only 320 times. Although the Canadiens scored the fewest short-handed goals during the regular season (4), they tied the Toronto Maple Leafs for the fewest short-handed goals allowed (5).

Final standings

Schedule and results

Playoffs
The Canadiens placed first in the division, and played the fourth-place Whalers in the first round. The Canadiens won the series 4–3 to advance to the second round. In the second round, the Bruins defeated the Canadiens 4–0 to eliminate the Canadiens. Coach Pat Burns, who was increasingly criticized in the media, resigned after the season.

Player statistics

Regular season
Scoring

Goaltending

Playoffs
Scoring

Goaltending

Awards and records
 Patrick Roy, Vezina Trophy, William M. Jennings Trophy
 Guy Carbonneau, Frank J. Selke Trophy

Transactions

Draft picks

Farm teams

See also
 1991–92 NHL season
 1991 NHL Entry Draft
 1992 Stanley Cup playoffs
 1992 NHL All-Star Game

References
 Canadiens on Hockey Database
 Canadiens on NHL Reference
Notes

Montreal Canadiens seasons
Montreal Canadiens season, 1991-92
Montreal
Adams Division champion seasons